Muman-e Bala (also Romanized as Mūmān-e Bālā; also known as Moman, Momān Post, and Mūmān) is a village in Jahliyan Rural District, in the Central District of Konarak County, Sistan and Baluchestan Province, Iran. At the 2006 census, its population was 190, in 41 families.

References 

Populated places in Konarak County